Aphanites (adj. aphanitic) are igneous rocks that are so fine-grained that their component mineral crystals are not visible to the naked eye (in contrast to phanerites, in which the crystals are visible to the unaided eye). This geological texture results from rapid cooling in volcanic or hypabyssal (shallow subsurface) environments. As a rule, the texture of these rocks is not the same as that of volcanic glass (e.g., obsidian), with volcanic glass being non-crystalline (amorphous), and having a glass-like appearance.

Aphanites are commonly porphyritic, having large crystals embedded in the fine groundmass, or matrix.  The larger inclusions are called phenocrysts. They consist essentially of very small crystals of minerals such as plagioclase feldspar, with hornblende or augite, and may contain also biotite, quartz, and orthoclase.

Common rocks that can be aphanitic
 Andesite
 Basalt
 Basanite
 Dacite
 Felsite
 Phonolite
 Rhyolite
 Trachyte

References

Aphanitic rocks
Igneous petrology
Volcanic rocks
Subvolcanic rocks